Mahyar (also Romanized as Mahyār) is a village in Dasht Rural District, in the Central District of Shahreza County, Isfahan Province, Iran. At the 2006 census, its population was 1,362, in 347 families.

References 

Populated places in Shahreza County